Billy Goat was a band playing rock, funk and Latin styles from 1989 to 1997 that frontman Mike Dillon later described as "a funk-punk band in the vein of the Red Hot Chili Peppers". Originating in Denton, Texas, Billy Goat was popular in the Dallas and Austin scenes including Deep Ellum and became known for its wild stage antics. One published reason for disbanding was turmoil caused from a tour van crash. Putting music ahead of antics, the band reformed with a new line-up in Kansas City prior to the 1995 release, Black and White. The more recent project of Dillon, Go-Go Jungle, has ties to Billy Goat's second incarnation including band members Go-Go Ray and J.J. Richards.

Band members 
 Mike Dillon – percussion, vocals (1989–97)
 Kim Pruitt – dance, vocals (1989–97)
 Philip Andrew Major AKA "Phillygoat" – guitar, vocals
 Kenny Withrow – guitar
 Brandon Smith – bass, vocals
 Earl Harvin Jr. – drums
 Sydney Madden – guitar, vocals (1993–97)
 Zac Baird – keyboards, vocals (1993–96)
 Eric Korb – guitar (1989)
 Mike Malinin – Drums (1989)
 Seth Moody – bass, vocals
 Steve Roehm – drums
 Jonas Shelton – guitar
 J.J. Richards – bass (1994–97)
 Go-Go Ray – drums (1994–97)

Discography 
 Bukie 1990
 Bush Roaming Mammals  1992
 Live at the Swinger's Ball  1994
 Black and White 1995

References

External links
 Tribute to Billy Goat maintained by Drum Counselor
 Official Music Video for the song "Chef"
 Fansite

Rock music groups from Texas
Korn